The Schierenbeke is a  left tributary of the Große Aue, or Neuer Mühlenbach as it is known in its upper reaches in the German state of North Rhine-Westphalia. The stream lies entirely within the East Westphalian parish of Rödinghausen in the district of Herford.

Course 
The river flows in a west-to-east direction south of and parallel to the Wiehengebirge hills. In its upper reaches the stream runs through the Schierenbeke Nature Reserve. The valley at the 1.0 kilometre point is known locally as the Wolfskammer ("Wolf's Chamber"). A left tributary of the Schierenbeke is the Wehmerhorster Bach, which enters at kilometre 0.8. The Schierenbeke discharges into the Neuer Mühlenbach or Große Aue at a point 81.5 km up the Aue from its mouth.

Beke or Biäke means Bach or 'stream' in the Low German language.

Nature 

The streams are classified as 'near-natural'. Their water quality of class I to II supports a large number of rare animal species. The boundary of the region is close to the nature reserves of Wehmerhorster Wiesental and Auebachtal.

See also
List of rivers in Ostwestfalen-Lippe

References

External links 

Naturschutzgebiet Schierenbeke

Rivers of North Rhine-Westphalia
Rivers of Germany